A light-emitting diode tattoo is a type of body modification similar to a tattoo, but specifically involves implantation of technologically based materials versus traditional ink injection into the layers of the skin. LED tattoos are accomplished by a combination of silicon-silk technology and a miniature lighting device known as a light-emitting diode.  While there is potential for many applications in the medical, commercial and personal domains, the technology is still in the development stage.

Technological limitations
Current medical devices are limited by their isolation from the body and their placement on rigid silicon. Current devices also contain gold and titanium which are required for electrical connections. Both gold and titanium are bio-compatible which means that they will not be rejected by the body as a foreign substance. However, biocompatibility is not as preferable as biodegradable is due to the fact that the latter does not leave behind any unnecessary materials; so researchers are working on biodegradable contacts to eliminate all remnants but the silicon. The current form of the LED tattoo has been implanted on mice without harm.  Current research on silicon-silk technology is being conducted at the University of Pennsylvania's Engineering Department. Additionally, the Royal Philips Electronics of the Netherlands has shown commercial interest in the research of silicon silk technology, specifically LED tattoos as a means to extend the digital experience, or interactivity with the digital product.

Development
Future LED tattoos may use silicon chips that are around the length of a small grain of rice which has the dimensions of about 1 millimeters and just 250 nanometers thick. The chips are placed on thin films of silk, which cause the electronics to conform to biological tissue. This process is aided when saline solution is added, helping the silicon mold to the shape of the skin. Silk dissolves away over time, which can occur immediately after the operation or over the course of several years, leaving the thin silicon circuits in place. While silicon has not been proven to be biocompatible all studies show it to be safe and it has been used in many other medical implant operations including implantation of silicon chips in mice. The circuits do not cause irritation because they are nanometers thick. LED tattoos would not interfere with normal physiological processes.

Medical application
The U.S. Food and Drug Administration (FDA) have approved LED technology but LED tattoos are undergoing continual development. One such medical application would be silk-silicon LEDs to create photonic tattoos which would assist in blood-sugar readings.

See also

 Biomechanical art
 OLED

References

External links
Mgrdichian, Laura  "Stretchable Silicon May Inspire a New Wave of Electronics" physorg.com June 13, 2007
Estes, Adam Clarke "The Freaky, Bioelectric Future of Tattoos" July 1, 2014

Body modification
Tattoo
Tattoos by type